Yang Changji (21 April 1871 – 17 January 1920) was a Chinese educator, philosopher, and writer. After advanced studies in Japan and Europe, he taught at  Hunan First Normal University, where he exerted considerable influence on Mao Zedong, Cai Hesen, Xiao Zisheng, and others, and then at Peking University. He became considered one of the leading philosophers of his generation before his early death.

Biography
Yang was born in Changsha County of Changsha prefecture in Hunan Province of China during the Qing Dynasty. During his childhood, Yang studied at Cheng-Zhu school. He first attended school at the age of 7. In 1898, Yang was accepted to Yuelu Academy. He promoted democracy and supported Kang Youwei and Liang Qichao. After the Hundred Days' Reform, he retired into the country. In 1903, Yang entered Hongwen Academy. After graduating, he attended University of Tsukuba. In 1909, Yang studied at the University of Aberdeen, majoring in philosophy and ethics. He then went on to study literature at University of Edinburgh, graduating in 1912.

In 1912, Yang went to Germany on an education investigation. From 1913 to 1918, Yang worked in Hunan First Normal University. His students included Mao Zedong, Cai Hesen and Deng Zhongxia. 
Befriending Mao, professor Yang urged him to read a radical newspaper, New Youth (Xin qingnian), the creation of his friend Chen Duxiu, a dean at Peking University.
From 1918 to 1920, Yang taught ethics in Peking University.

Yang died at the Beijing Germany Hospital in 1920, aged 48.

Personal life
Yang married Xiang Zhenxi, they had a daughter named Yang Kaihui, she married Mao Zedong in Hunan First Normal University in 1920, they had 3 children.

Works
 Dahuazhai Daily
 Collected Works of Yang Changji
 The origin problem of Ethics

Notes

References and further reading
 "Sage in residence: Yang Changji," Ch 6 in 

1871 births
People from Changsha County
Academic staff of Peking University
University of Tsukuba alumni
Alumni of the University of Edinburgh
Writers from Changsha
Philosophers from Hunan
1920 deaths
Republic of China philosophers
Educators from Hunan